Back passage may refer to:

An alley behind, for example, a building
A human anus (vulgar slang)